Widmoor is a hamlet in the parishes of Hedsor and Wooburn, in Buckinghamshire, England.

References 

Hamlets in Buckinghamshire
Wycombe District